Kim Ji-soo (born 24 February 2004) is a South Korean professional footballer who plays as a centre-back for the South Korean club Seongnam.

Career
Kim joined the youth academy of Seongnam as a U15 and worked his way up their youth categories. On 7 February 2022, he signed his first semi-professional contract with the club ahead of the 2022 K League 1 season. In doing so, he became the clubs first ever semi-pro player and youngest registered player in the league that season. On 18 October 2022, he was registered as a fully professional player. He made 19 appearances in his debut season with the club, earning interest from clubs abroad.

International career
Kim is a youth international for Korea, having played up to the South Korea U20s. He was called up by the U20s to play at the 2023 AFC U-20 Asian Cup.

Playing style
Kim is a strong and tall centre-back with quick feet. He is able to score, and can play with both feet. He has earned playstyle comparisons to Kim Min-jae.

References

External links
 

2004 births
Living people
People from Bucheon
South Korean footballers
South Korea youth international footballers
Association football defenders
K League 1 players
Seongnam FC players
First Professional Football League (Bulgaria) players